Filippos Iakovidis (born 14 April 1998) is a Cypriot swimmer. He represented Cyprus at the 2019 World Aquatics Championships in Gwangju, South Korea. He competed in the men's 50 metre backstroke and men's 100 metre backstroke events and in both events he did not advance to compete in the semi-finals.

In the same year, he won the silver medal in the men's 100 metre backstroke event at the 2019 Games of the Small States of Europe held in Budva, Montenegro.

References 

1998 births
Living people
Place of birth missing (living people)
Cypriot male swimmers
Male backstroke swimmers
Swimmers at the 2018 Mediterranean Games
Swimmers at the 2022 Mediterranean Games
Mediterranean Games competitors for Cyprus
Swimmers at the 2022 Commonwealth Games
Commonwealth Games competitors for Cyprus
20th-century Cypriot people
21st-century Cypriot people